Vanninen or Vänninen is a Finnish surname. Notable people with the surname include:

Benjamin Vanninen (1921–1975), Finnish cross-country skier
Henna Vänninen (born 1983), Finnish actress
Jukka Vanninen (born 1977), Finnish footballer
Pekka Vanninen (1911–1970), Finnish cross-country skier

Finnish-language surnames